This is the chronological history of cover models for the Sports Illustrated Swimsuit Issue.  The Sports Illustrated Swimsuit Issue has grown from being an issue of Sports Illustrated magazine created to fill space at a time of year with little sports news into a major marketing franchise that includes a special separate issue, a website, television specials, calendars, books and enormous amounts of advertising.  It began as a short photo spread of women in bathing suits and has become a fashion issue for beachwear worn by the world's top models. Being the subject of the Sports Illustrated magazine cover is a well chronicled event which has both become a measure by which fame is measured and a status which is supposedly accompanied by a curse known as the "SI jinx".  There seems to have been no reports of any association of the SI jinx with the swimsuit issue.

There is a lot of public interest in who is on the cover of fashion magazines with websites dedicated to the subject.  For supermodels being on the cover of important magazines is a matter of prestige and achieving the cover of Sports Illustrated's annual swimsuit edition is quite a celebrated highlight.  It is especially noteworthy if a cover model has a solo cover appearance.  The unveiling of the swimsuit issue cover and its model is a media event, widely reported in the press.

For some, the image of these models on the cover of a sports magazine is a moral issue.  The issue generates numerous letters from readers both in support and in opposition of the issue each year.  Numerous subscribers cancel subscriptions as a matter of propriety annually.  Recently, Time Warner took action to avoid many of the complainants by withholding the Swimsuit issue from certain types of recipients, such as libraries and schools.

Numerous  types of trivia and statistics are monitored regarding the swimsuit issue cover subjects.  Several have gone on to subsequent success in Hollywood.  Others have become the spouses of notable celebrities.  The following list is a list of models chosen as subjects for the Sports Illustrated Swimsuit Issue cover, incorporating some related statistics and trivia.

List of covers

Models on multiple covers

References

Cover models
Lists of female models
Lists of people by magazine appearance